Intihuatana is a ritual stone in South America associated with the astronomic clock or calendar of the Inca. Its name is derived from the local Quechua language. The most notable Intihuatana is an archaeological site located at Machu Picchu in the Sacred Valley near Machu Picchu, Peru.  The name of the stone (coined perhaps by Hiram Bingham) is derived from Quechua: inti means "sun", and wata- is the verb root "to tie, hitch (up)" (huata- is simply a Spanish spelling). The Quechua -na suffix derives nouns for tools or places. Hence inti watana is literally an instrument or place to "tie up the sun", often expressed in English as "The Hitching Post of the Sun".

Intihuatana was damaged on September 8, 2000 when a crane being used in an ad shoot toppled over and chipped off a piece of the granite.

See also
 Inti Watana, Urubamba

References

Ancient astronomy
Inca Empire